This is a list of notable individuals buried at Melbourne General Cemetery.

List of burials

A

 Douglas Alexandra (1922–2000), architect
 Sir Harry Brookes Allen (1854–1926), pathologist

B

 Mendel Balberyszski (1894–1966), Jewish community leader, historian of the destruction of the Vilna Ghetto in Lithuania. 
 Sir Redmond Barry (1813–1880), Acting Chief Justice who sentenced Ned Kelly to hang; instrumental in the foundation of the Royal Melbourne Hospital, the University of Melbourne, and the State Library of Victoria 
 Auguste de Bavay (1856–1944), Belgian-born brewer and industrial chemist
 James Beaney (1828–1891), surgeon
 Rivett Bland (1811–1894), colonial administrator and gold miner
 Hugh Brophy (1829–1919), Fenian
 Sir Anthony Brownless (1817–1897), physician, Chancellor of Melbourne University
 Robert O'Hara Burke (1821–1861) explorer (see Burke and Wills expedition)
 William Burnley (1813-1860), politician, early Melbourne pioneer for whom Burnley was named

C
 
 Hughie Cairns (1888-1929), jockey, first jockey to win the W.S. Cox Plate and the Melbourne Cup in the same year
 Arthur Calwell (1896–1973), Politician, Leader of the Federal Opposition
 Comte Lionel de Moreton de Chabrillan (1818–1858), first French Consul
 William Champ (1808–1892), Premier of Tasmania
 Janet Clarke (1851–1909), benefactor
 Marcus Clarke (1846–1881), novelist & poet, author of For the Term of His Natural Life
 Sir William Clarke (1831–1897), landowner and philanthropist
 James Coates (1901–1947), confidence trickster, racketeer, underworld figure
 Kelvin Coe (1946–1992), ballet dancer
 Mario Condello (1952–2006), solicitor, underworld figure
 Tom Corrigan (1851–1894), champion Irish jockey, died in a fall at Caulfield
 George Coulthard (1856–1883), sportsman, pioneer of cricket and Australian football

D

 Derrimut (c1810-1864), Boonwurrung leader in early days of Melbourne
 Louise Dyer (1884–1962), music publisher

E

 William Henry Ellerker (1837–1891), architect
 George Elmslie (1861–1918), first Labor Premier of Victoria

F

 John Pascoe Fawkner (1792–1869), one of the founders of Melbourne
 Frederick Federici (1850–1888), opera singer, who created the title role in The Mikado in New York in 1885
 Edmund Finn (1819–1898), journalist, wrote under the nom-de-plume "Garryowen"
 Kathleen Fitzpatrick (1905–1990), historian
 'Tracker' Forbes (1865-1922), Australian footballer
 James Goodall Francis (1819–1884), Premier of Victoria
 Malcolm Fraser (1930–2015), 22nd Prime Minister of Australia

G

 Jack Galbally (1910–1990), solicitor, politician
 James Galloway (1828–1860), trade unionist, leader of the Eight Hours' Movement
 S.T. Gill (1818–1880), artist
 Duncan Gillies (1834–1903), Premier of Victoria
 Samuel Gillott (1838–1913), politician, Mayor of Melbourne 
 Sir John Gorton (1911–2002), 19th Prime Minister of Australia
 Thomas Grady VC DSM (To más Ó Grádaigh) (1835–1891), Irish Victoria Cross recipient in the Crimean War
 Edward Grayndler (1867–1943), AWU General-Secretary, politician
 Augustus Greeves (1806–1874), politician, Mayor of Melbourne
 Thomas Griffiths (1865–1947), General & Colonial Administrator
 Mrs Aeneas Gunn (Jeannie Gunn) (1870–1961), writer, author of We of the Never Never

H

 Eliza Hall (1847–1916), benefactor, founder of Walter and Eliza Hall Institute of Medical Research
Greg Ham (1953–2012), musician
William Hammersley (1826–1886), cricketer, writer, codifier of Australian Rules Football
 Patrick Hannan (1840–1925), discoverer of gold at Kalgoorlie
 Frank Hare (1830–1892), police officer in charge of the Kelly Gang hunt
 Richard Heales (1822–1864), Premier of Victoria
 John Hennings (1835–1898), artist and theatre impresario
 Hermann Herlitz (1834–1920), Lutheran pastor and pioneer
 Robert Hoddle (1794–1881), surveyor, designer of Melbourne
 Henry Hopwood (1813–1869), convict, pioneer, founder of Echuca (Tomb only; body actually buried in Echuca)
 Tom Horan (1854–1916), Test cricketer, wrote on cricket under the nom-de-plume "Felix"
 Anthony Hordern (1788–1869), founder of the department store dynasty
 Sir Charles Hotham (1806–1855), Governor of Victoria

I

 Sir Isaac Isaacs (1855–1948), the first Australian-born Governor General
 John Iliffe (1846–1914), Dentistry pioneer

K

 Araluen Kendall (1869–1870), infant daughter of Henry Kendall, commemorated in the poem "Araluen"
 Sir James Kennedy (1882–1954), sportsman and politician
 John King (1838–1872), explorer, sole survivor of Burke and Wills expedition
 Lowe Kong Meng (1830/31-1888), Chinese Australian businessman

L

 Peter Lalor (1827–1889), leader of the Eureka Stockade 
 Walter Lindrum (1898–1960), billiards champion, has a distinctive tombstone in the shape of a billiard table

M

 John Macadam (1827–1865), scientist and politician, for whom the Macadamia nut was named 
 Sir John Henry MacFarland (1851–1935), educator, Chancellor of the University
 Sir John Madden (1844–1918), Chief Justice
 Emily Lydia Mather (1865–1891), victim of Frederick Bailey Deeming
 John Reid McGowan ("Gentleman Jack") (1872–1912), boxing champion 
 Evander McIver (1834–1902), architect
 Dame Pattie Menzies (1899–1995), Spouse of Sir Robert Menzies 
 Sir Robert Menzies (1894–1978), 12th Prime Minister of Australia 
 Billy Midwinter (1851–1890), Test cricketer for both England and Australia
 Sir Norman Mighell (1894–1955), Anzac and Diplomat
 Sam Morris (1855–1931), Test cricketer

N

 William Nicholson (1816–1865), Premier of Victoria, Mayor, advocate of secret ballot
 Robert Nickle (1786–1855), Army commander

O

 Mietta O'Donnell (1950–2001), restaurateur, chef and food writer
 Cornelius O'Mahony (1840–1879), Gaelic scholar and Fenian
 Sir John O'Shanassy (1818–1883), Premier of Victoria

P

 Roy Park (1892–1947), Test cricketer, footballer (Melbourne), soldier, doctor
 John Parnell, (1860–1931), soldier & administrator
 Sir James Patterson (1833–1895), Premier of Victoria
 John Giles Price (1808–1857), Magistrate, murdered by convicts at Williamstown

R

 William Ramsay (1868–1914), developer and founder of Kiwi Boot Polish
 Richard Read (the Younger) (c.1796-1862), colonial artist
 Moses Rintel (1823–1880), pioneering Rabbi
 Robert Russell (1808–1900), architect, pioneer

S

 Carty Salmon (1860–1917), politician, Speaker of the House of Representatives
 William Sams (1792–1871), colonial administrator, key figure in the founding of Melbourne
 Jack Saunders (1876–1927), Test cricketer 
 James Scullin, ninth Prime Minister of Australia 
 Sarah Scullin, Spouse of the Prime Minister of Australia
 Clara Seekamp (1819–1908), actress, teacher, writer, first female editor of an Australian newspaper
 James Service (1823–1899), Premier of Victoria
 Hattie Shepparde (1846 – 1874), actress and opera singer - buried with her mother and infant daughter 
 John Singleton (1808–1891), physician, philanthropist, evangelical Christian, social reformer; founder of the Royal Children's Hospital and Melbourne City Mission 
 John Thomas Smith (1816–1879), publican, Victorian colonial politician, seven times Lord Mayor of Melbourne, for whom Smith St. was named
 Brettena Smyth (1840–1898), feminist, suffragette, freethinker, family planning advocate
 Sir Arthur Snowden (1829–1918), politician, lawyer, mayor
 Captain Frederick Standish (1824-1883), Police Commissioner, diarist
 Thomas Welton Stanford (1832–1918), businessman, brother of Stanford University founder Leland Stanford
 Peter Steele (1939–2012), poet
 James Stephens (1821–1889), stonemason, Chartist and Eight Hours' campaigner
 Joseph Sternberg, (1852–1898), politician
 Alfred Stirling (1902–1981), diplomat
 Davie Strath (1849–1879), golfer
 Selina Sutherland (1839–1909), health and child welfare worker

T

 Julian Thomas (1843–1896), journalist, wrote under the nom-de-plume "The Vagabond"
 Sir John Thurston (1836–1897), Fijian colonial administrator
 Thomas Topping (1828–1895), stonemason, Eight Hours' campaign pioneer
 Elizabeth Tripp (1809–1899), educational pioneer
 Gerard Tucker (1885–1974), founder of the Brotherhood of St Laurence

V

 Julie Vieusseux (1820–1878), educator and artist

W

 Sir Henry Weedon (1859–1921), Lord Mayor and parliamentarian
 Clarence Whistler (1856–1885), wrestler 
 William John Wills (1834–1861), explorer (see Burke and Wills expedition)
 Edward Wilson (1813–1878), journalist
 Ray Wilson (1910–1938), jockey
 John Wroe (1782-1863), religious visionary, founder of the Christian Israelites
 Samuel Wynn (1891–1982), restaurateur, wine merchant

Y

 Florence Young (1870–1920), actress & singer

Z
 Traugott Zwar (1876–1947), soldier, writer, surgeon

References

 
Melbourne
Melbourne